General elections were held in Liberia in May 1885. In the presidential election, the result was a victory for incumbent Hilary R. W. Johnson of the True Whig Party (the dominant ruling party at the time), who was re-elected for a second term.

Results

References

Liberia
1885 in Liberia
Elections in Liberia
May 1885 events
Election and referendum articles with incomplete results